Frederik van Hulsen, or Friedrich von Hulsen, also known as Hulseen and Fredericus Hulsius (1580 – 1665) was a Dutch Golden Age printmaker active in Frankfurt and Nuremberg.

He was born in Middelburg and became a pupil of Jan Theodor de Bry and was known for line engravings. He died in Frankfurt.

References
Frederik van Hulsen in the RKD

1580 births
1665 deaths
People from Middelburg, Zeeland
Dutch Golden Age printmakers
German engravers